Hickling is a surname. Notable people with the surname include:

 Archie Hickling, the English electrochemist who built the first three electrodes potentiostat in 1942
 Billy Hickling, English footballer
 Frank Hickling (born 1941), Australian army officer
 Garett Hickling (born 1970), Canadian wheelchair rugby player
 Hugh Hickling (1920–2007), British lawyer, colonial civil servant, law academic and author
 Ronald Hickling (1912–2006), British ornithologist 
 Thomas Hickling (born 1940), English cricketer